Pedro Almeida may refer to:
Vítor Almeida (runner) (born 1970), Portuguese middle-distance runner
Vítor Almeida (footballer) (born 1991), Portuguese footballer who plays as a defender